In Roman mythology, Laverna was a goddess of thieves, cheats and the underworld. She was propitiated by libations poured with the left hand. The poet Horace and the playwright Plautus call her a goddess of thieves. In Rome, her sanctuary was near the Porta Lavernalis.

History
Laverna was an old Italian deity, originally one of the spirits of the underworld. By an easy transition, she came to be regarded as the protectress of thieves, whose operations were associated with darkness.

She had an altar on the Aventine Hill, near the gate called after her Lavernalis, and a grove on the Via Salaria. Her aid was invoked by thieves to enable them to carry out their plans successfully without forfeiting their reputation for piety and honesty. Many explanations have been given of the name:

Popular culture
Her name is used for the main antagonist in the CGI animation Barbie: Fairytopia film series. Laverna is an evil fairy who is the twin sister of the land's fairy queen, The Enchantress.

In “The Murders in the Rue Morgue,” Edgar Allan Poe’s Dupin describes the ineffective Prefect of Police as “too cunning to be profound.  In his wisdom is no stamen.  It is all head and no body, like the pictures of the Goddess Laverna.”

Notes

References

Further reading

Commerce goddesses
Roman goddesses
Trickster goddesses
Underworld goddesses